The twentieth season of The Bachelor premiered on January 4, 2016. This season featured 26-year-old Ben Higgins, a software salesman from Warsaw, Indiana.

Higgins attended Indiana University, where he graduated with a BS in business administration and management through the school of public and environmental affairs (SPEA). In addition, he was also a member of Delta Upsilon's Indiana chapter where he served as the vice president of external affairs. He finished in third place on the 11th season of The Bachelorette featuring Kaitlyn Bristowe.

The season concluded on March 14, 2016, with Higgins choosing to propose to 25-year-old flight attendant Lauren Bushnell. They ended their engagement on May 15, 2017.

Filming and development

Casting and contestants
Casting began during the 19th season of the show. On August 24, 2015, during season one, episode four of Bachelor in Paradise: After Paradise, Ben Higgins was announced as the next Bachelor.

Notable contestant includes previous season's runner-up Becca Tilley and fellow contestant Amber James; news anchor Olivia Caridi from WCYB-TV; and Joelle "JoJo" Fletcher, who is a half-sister of Ready for Love star Ben Patton.

Production
The season traveled to many places including Las Vegas, Nevada, Mexico City, Mexico, Pig Island in The Bahamas and the state of Indiana, with appearances from rapper Ice Cube, comedian Kevin Hart, soccer players Alex Morgan, Kelley O'Hara, comedian Terry Fator, and Indiana Pacers basketball players Paul George and George Hill.

Contestants
The season began with 28 contestants, including a set of twins.

Future appearances

The Bachelorette

JoJo Fletcher was chosen as the lead of season 12 of The Bachelorette.

Bachelor in Paradise

Season 3

Caila Quinn, Lauren Himle, Tiara Soleim, Jami Letain, Shushanna Mkrtychyan, Jennifer Saviano, Izzy Goodkind, Lace Morris, Jubilee Sharpe, Leah Block, Haley Ferguson, Emily Ferguson, and Amanda Stanton returned for the third season of Bachelor in Paradise. Block and Sharpe were eliminated in week 1. Emily and Haley quit in week 4. Goodkind, Mkrtychyan, and Quinn quit in week 5. Himle, Letain, and Soleim were eliminated in week 5. Saviano split from Nick Viall in week 6. Stanton and Morris left engaged to Josh Murray and Grant Kemp, respectively.

Season 4

Stanton, Emily and Haley returned for season 4. Emily and Haley quit in week 4. Stanton split from Robby Hayes in week 4.

Season 5

Mkrtychyan and Sharpe returned for season 5. Sharpe quit in week 3. Mkrtychyan split from Robby Hayes in week 6.

Season 6

Saviano and Haley Ferguson returned for the sixth season. Saviano was eliminated in week 3. Ferguson was eliminated in week 5.

Season 8

Morris returned for the eighth season. She quit in week 3.

The Bachelor Winter Games

Higgins returned for The Bachelor Winter Games under Team USA. He quit week 3.

Outside of Bachelor Nation

Higgins and Bushnell appeared in their own reality series, Ben and Lauren: Happily Ever After?, on the sister network Freeform. Emily and Haley starred in the Freeform reality series The Twins: Happily Ever After?

Call-out order

 The contestant received the first impression rose
 The contestant received a rose during the date
 The contestant was eliminated
 The contestant was eliminated during the date
 The contestant was eliminated outside the rose ceremony
 The contestant quit the competition 
 The contestant won the competition

Episodes

Post-show
On May 15, 2017, the couple announced their breakup.

Ben married Jessica Clarke on November 13, 2021. 

Lauren married Chris Lane on October 25, 2019. Lauren and Chris have two children together, Dutton Walker (born June 8, 2021) and Baker Weston (born October 16, 2022).

References

External links

The Bachelor (American TV series) seasons
2016 American television seasons
Television shows filmed in California
Television shows shot in the Las Vegas Valley
Television shows filmed in Mexico
Television shows filmed in the Bahamas
Television shows filmed in Indiana
Television shows filmed in Illinois
Television shows filmed in Oregon
Television shows filmed in Ohio
Television shows filmed in Texas
Television shows filmed in Jamaica